This is a list of the reptiles of the archipelago of Puerto Rico. The Puerto Rican archipelago consists of the main island of Puerto Rico, two island municipalities, Vieques and Culebra, one minor uninhabited island, Mona and several smaller islands and cays.

This list only includes animals with verifiable established populations in the archipelago of Puerto Rico. Many species of reptiles are imported, both legally (mainly through the pet industry) and illegally, to the archipelago of Puerto Rico every year, with some of these species being subsequently released into the wild. However, non-viable introduced species do not constitute a breeding population and hence they lack inclusion in this list.

The following tags help provide additional information regarding the status of each species.
 Endemic species
 Introduced species
 Extinct species
 Extirpated species

Reptiles

Family Emydidae

Family Dermochelyidae

Family Cheloniidae

Family Testudinidae

Infraorder Gekkota

Family Teiidae

Family Scincidae

Family Anguinidae

Family Iguanidae

Family Amphisbaenidae

Family Typhlopidae

Family Boidae

Family Colubridae

See also

Fauna of Puerto Rico
List of endemic fauna of Puerto Rico
List of endemic flora of Puerto Rico
List of mammals of Puerto Rico
List of birds of Puerto Rico
List of amphibians of Puerto Rico

Footnotes
 This species is endemic to the archipelago of Puerto Rico.
 This species is extinct.
 This species no longer occurs in the archipelago Puerto Rico but other populations exist elsewhere.
 This species was introduced to the archipelago of Puerto Rico.
 This species occurs in Caja de Muertos Island.
 This species occurs in Cayo Batata.
 This species occurs in Cayo Santiago.
 This species occurs in the island of Desecheo.
 This species occurs in Magueyes island.
 This species occurs in the island of Monito.
 This species occurs in the island of Culebrita.

References

 

 01
Reptiles
Puerto Rico
 Puerto Rico